John Mettham Richardson (December 1872 – 10 July 1920) was an English footballer who made 72 appearances in the Football League playing for Lincoln City and Gainsborough Trinity. He played as a centre half or left half.

Richardson was the eldest child of Clark Richardson and Mary Ann (née Mettham), who married in February 1872. He married Lucy Brown in 1897. They had a daughter, Lottie Florence Richardson, in 1898. He later worked as a metal machinist before his death at age 47.

References

1872 births
1920 deaths
Sportspeople from Lincoln, England
English footballers
Association football wing halves
Lincoln City F.C. players
Gainsborough Trinity F.C. players
English Football League players
Date of birth missing